New Marston Meadows is a  biological Site of Special Scientific Interest in Oxford in Oxfordshire.

These meadows in the floodplain of the River Cherwell are traditionally managed for hay or by grazing. Some plants are typical of those on ancient meadows, such as common meadow-rue, pepper-saxifrage, devil's-bit scabious, adder's-tongue fern, smooth brome and meadow barley. Snake's head fritillary, which is nationally scarce, is also found at the site.

References

 
Sites of Special Scientific Interest in Oxfordshire